Djay may refer to:
 Djay Brawner
 djay (software)
 DJay, a character in Hustle & Flow

See also
 DJ (disambiguation)
 Deejay (disambiguation)